No Name is a Slovak rock band. It was formed in Košice on 26 August 1996 by Viliam Gutray and three Timko brothers - Igor, Roman, and Ivan.
Marián Čekovský joined No Name as a keyboardist and was replaced by Zoli Šallai after leaving the band. A few years later, the youngest Timko brother, Dušan, also became a member of No Name.

No Name became known to Slovak audiences in part by playing the Bratislavská lýra festival
, but their came with their second album, Počkám si na zázrak (I'll Wait for a Miracle), which featured the hit singles "Ty a Tvoja sestra" (You and Your Sister) and "Žily" (Veins).

Band members
Current members
 Igor Timko - vocals
 Roman Timko - guitar, vocals
 Zoltán Šallai - keyboards, vocals
 Ivan Timko - drums, vocals
 Dušan Timko - guitar
 Pavol Jakab - bass

Past members
 Marián Čekovský - keyboards
 Viliam Gutray - bass

Discography
Studio albums
 No Name (1998)
 Počkám si na zázrak (2000)
 Oslávme si život (2001)
 Slová do tmy (2003)
 Čím to je (2005)
 V rovnováhe (2008)
 Nový album (2011)
 Love Songs (2012)
 S Láskou (2015)

EPs
 Kto Dokáže - with Karel Gott (2016)

Live albums
 Live in Prague (2008)
 G2 Acoustic Stage (2014)
 20 Rokov No Name (2019)
 Dermacol Acoustic Tour (2019)

Compilation albums
 The Best of No Name (2009)
 No Name Box (2018)

DVDs
 Live in Europe (2006)
 V rovnováhe tour (2010)
 Tour 2011 Steel Arena Košice (2011)
 G2 Acoustic Stage (2014)
 No Name Box (2018)
 20 Rokov No Name (2019)

Awards and recognition
 Český slavík 2016 - Best Slovak Artist

See also
 The 100 Greatest Slovak Albums of All Time

References

External links

 Official website

Culture and Arts in Košice
Slovak musical groups